The Mad Doctor is a 1935 novel by Australian author F. J. Thwaites, a melodramatic medical romance set in Africa.

Thwaites based the novel on a story he heard from an old man while crossing the Atlantic in 1933. However, he changed the tragic ending to a more optimistic one.

Plot

A Sydney surgeon is sent to jail. When he gets out, finding himself a social outcast, he goes to work in the African jungle. Although he only works among the native Africans, his reputation as a miracle worker in cases of paralysis spreads far and wide.

Adaptation

The novel was adapted for radio in Adelaide in 1936. During the production of this, Thwaites met the actress Jessica Harcourt, who he later married.

The Mad Doctor in Harley Street

The Mad Doctor in Harley Street is a 1938 novel by F. J. Thwaites. A sequel to The Mad Doctor, it describes the doctor's efforts to get his cure recognised by the medical establishment in London. A contemporary review says that the novel "bubbles over with sentimentalism."

The novel was adapted for radio in 1938.

References

External links
The Mad Doctor at AustLit
The Mad Doctor of Harley Street at AustLit

1935 Australian novels
Novels set in Africa
Medicine and health in fiction